Dachau may refer to:
Dachau, Bavaria, a town in Germany
Dachau Bahnhof, main train station of Dachau
Dachau (district), a rural district in Bavaria 
Dachau art colony, an early 20th century art colony in Bavaria
Dachau concentration camp, a World War II Nazi forced-labor camp
Dachau trials, trials for war crimes held in the former concentration camp
Dachau (US Army report), a 1945 report on the concentration camp

See also
Dacha